The 2014–15 season  is Naft Tehran's 5th season in the Pro League. They will also be competing in the Hazfi Cup & AFC Champions League. Naft Tehran is captained by Alireza Ezzati.

First Team Squad
As of December 31, 2014

Loan list

For recent transfers, see List of Iranian football transfers summer 2014 and List of Iranian football transfers winter 2014–15.

Transfers

In

Competitions

Overview

Results summary

Results by round

Matches

Hazfi Cup

AFC Champions League

Play-off round

Group stage

Knockout Phase

Friendly Matches

Pre-season

Club

Kit 

|
|

Official sponsors
•  Petro Pars
•  Merooj
Source:

External links
Iran Premier League Statistics
Persian League

References

Naft Tehran